Rose El Sharouni is a Dutch born Brazilian jiu-jitsu practitioner and competitor. A two-time World championship and three-time IBJJF European Championship medallist, El Sharouni is a two-time AJP Abu Dhabi World Pro silver medallist.

Biography 
Rose-Marie El Sharouni was born on 28 September 1991, in Heerlen, Netherlands. From the age of 6 she practised judo before leaving it for traditional Jiu jitsu, then Brazilian jiu-jitsu (BJJ) at the age of sixteen. She started to train and compete under Brazilian Jiu Jitsu Academy Amsterdam (a Checkmat affiliate). Training BJJ while studying medicine, she received her black belt from Vieira in 2019.

El Sharouni is the co-founder of Ladies Only BJJ, an organisation that set up BJJ training camps for women and promotes women's BJJ.

Championships and accomplishments 
Main Achievements (black belt level):
 2nd place IBJJF European Open (2022)
 2nd place AJP Abu Dhabi World Pro (2021 / 2022)
 3rd place IBJJF World Championship (2021 / 2022)
 3rd place IBJJF European Open (2020 / 2023)
 3rd place IBJJF London International Open (2023)

Main Achievements (Colored Belts):
 IBJJF European Open Champion (2015 blue, 2019 brown)
 3rd place IBJJF World Championship (2018 brown)

Awards 
 Ranked No. 1 European athlete in UAEJJF and AJP competitions. (2022)

Notes

References 

2000 births
Dutch practitioners of Brazilian jiu-jitsu
Living people
People awarded a black belt in Brazilian jiu-jitsu
World Brazilian Jiu-Jitsu Championship medalists
Female Brazilian jiu-jitsu practitioners